Manfred Atteneder (born 3 September 1962) is a former Austrian Paralympic athlete. He represented Austria at the 1984 Summer Paralympics and he won three medals in athletics, including the gold medal in the men's shot put C5 event, and a silver medal in powerlifting. He also represented Austria at the 1988 Summer Paralympics held in Seoul, South Korea and he won the bronze medal in the men's shot put C5 event. He also competed in the men's discus throw C5 and men's javelin throw C5 events.

References

External links 
 

Living people
1962 births
Place of birth missing (living people)
Paralympic athletes of Austria
Athletes (track and field) at the 1984 Summer Paralympics
Athletes (track and field) at the 1988 Summer Paralympics
Paralympic gold medalists for Austria
Paralympic silver medalists for Austria
Paralympic bronze medalists for Austria
Medalists at the 1984 Summer Paralympics
Medalists at the 1988 Summer Paralympics
Paralympic medalists in athletics (track and field)
Austrian male discus throwers
Austrian male javelin throwers
Austrian male shot putters
Austrian powerlifters
Powerlifters at the 1984 Summer Paralympics
20th-century Austrian people
21st-century Austrian people